The Spartan 8W Zeus, also designated FBW-1 Zeus was a military aircraft produced in small numbers in the United States in the late 1930s, based on the airframe of the Spartan Executive civil aircraft.

Design and development
The Spartan 8W Zeus was a conventional low-wing monoplane of metal construction, with a semi-monocoque fuselage and a cantilever wing. Two crew members sat in tandem beneath an extensively-glazed canopy, and the main units of the tailwheel undercarriage were retractable. Fitted with a fixed, forward-firing machine gun, a flexible machine gun, and capacity for light bombs under the wings, Spartan offered the Zeus to the USAAC for testing as an advanced trainer.

Following up on an earlier modified Spartan Executive military demonstrator, the Spartan 8W Zeus was powered by a more powerful  Pratt & Whitney Wasp engine.

Operational history
A  small production run of four or five examples was made but with no official interest, the project waned. Although no orders from the United States Army Air Corps followed, Spartan sold a number of examples to Mexico and China.

Following Mexico's refusal to accept the French and British non-intervention in the Spanish Civil War, the Mexican aircraft were purchased by the Spanish Republican military. In the end, however, the freighter carrying them was sunk and these US-made aircraft could not take part in the war.

Operators
Military

 Spanish Republican Air Force

Specifications

See also

References

Notes

Bibliography

 Donald, David. Encyclopedia of World Aircraft. Etobicoke, Ontario, Canada: Prospero Books;, 1997. .
 The Illustrated Encyclopedia of Aircraft. London: Aerospace Publishing (Orbis), 1981. OCLC 774502891.
 Taylor, Michael J. H. Jane's Encyclopedia of Aviation. London: Studio Editions, 1989. .

External links
 8W Zeus at Aerofiles

1930s United States military trainer aircraft
Spartan Aircraft Company aircraft
Single-engined tractor aircraft
Low-wing aircraft
Aircraft first flown in 1937